Cabonnichthys ("Burns' Cabonne fish") is an extinct genus of tristichopterid fish that lived in the Late Devonian period (Famennian) of Australia. It has been found in Canowindra and is a medium-sized carnivorous lobe-finned fish.

References

Tristichopterids
Prehistoric lobe-finned fish genera
Late Devonian animals
Late Devonian fish
Devonian bony fish
Prehistoric fish of Australia